Yimtubezinash Woldeamanuel Mulate is an Ethiopian physician and microbiologist researching infectious diseases, hospital-acquired infections, and antimicrobial resistance. She is an associate professor of medical microbiology at Addis Ababa University.

Life 
Woldeamanuel completed a M.Sc. and Ph.D. in medical microbiology and a M.D. at the Addis Ababa University (AAU). Woldeamanuel joined the faculty of AAU in 1997. She is an associate professor of medical microbiology. She heads the department of microbiology, immunology, and parasitology in the school of medicine at AAU. Woldeamanuel researches infectious diseases, hospital-acquired infections, antimicrobial resistance and multiple drug resistance. She investigates pathogens including MRSA, ESBL, VRE, and MDR-TB. Woldeamanuel is a Fellow of the Ethiopian Academy of Sciences.

References

External links 

 

Living people
Year of birth missing (living people)
Place of birth missing (living people)
Ethiopian microbiologists
20th-century women physicians
Ethiopian women scientists
20th-century women scientists
21st-century women physicians
21st-century women scientists
20th-century biologists
21st-century biologists
Women medical researchers
Women microbiologists
Addis Ababa University alumni
Academic staff of Addis Ababa University
Fellows of the Ethiopian Academy of Sciences